METZ is a Canadian punk rock band formed in 2007 in Ottawa and currently based in Toronto. The band consists of guitarist and vocalist Alex Edkins, bassist Chris Slorach and drummer Hayden Menzies.

History
METZ was formed in Ottawa, Ontario, in 2007 by guitarist/vocalist Alex Edkins and drummer Hayden Menzies, two longtime friends. After a year of working on material, Edkins and Menzies moved to Toronto and expanded to a trio with the addition of bassist Chris Slorach.

METZ released their eponymous debut album on the Sub Pop label in 2012. The album was named on the 2013 Polaris Music Prize long list. The band performed a "homecoming show" at Lee's Palace in Toronto that year.

On February 17, 2015, the band announced a new album, II, with the release of the album's first track, "Acetate", and an accompanying music video; the album was released May 5, 2015 in North America and the previous day elsewhere. II was a long-listed nominee for the 2015 Polaris Music Prize.

In May 2017, METZ announced their third studio album, Strange Peace, recorded by Steve Albini, which was released on September 22, 2017.

Drummer Hayden Menzies has a degree in fine art from Concordia University and designs the artwork for the band.

In July 2020, METZ announced that their fourth studio album, Atlas Vending, would arrive on October 9th via Sub Pop.

Band members
 Alex Edkins – guitars, vocals (2007–present)
 Hayden Menzies – drums (2007–present)
 Chris Slorach – bass (2008–present)

Discography

Studio albums
METZ (October 9, 2012, Sub Pop)
II (May 4, 2015, Sub Pop)
Strange Peace (September 22, 2017, Sub Pop)
Atlas Vending (October 9, 2020, Sub Pop)

Compilation albums 
Automat (July 12, 2019, Sub Pop)

Live albums 
Live At Ramsgate Music Hall (July 3, 2020, Bandcamp Download Only Release)
Live at the Opera House (August 4, 2021, Sub Pop)

Singles
 "Soft Whiteout" / "Lump Sums" (January 13, 2009, We Are Busy Bodies)
 "Ripped On The Fence" / "Dry Up" (June 9, 2009, We Are Busy Bodies)
 "Negative Space" / "Automat" (August 10, 2010, We Are Busy Bodies)
 Metz / Fresh Snow - "Pig" / "BMX Based Tactics" (April 21, 2012, The Sonic Boom Recording Co. / Sub Pop) - "Pig" is a Sparklehorse cover
 "Pig" (April 21, 2012, The Sonic Boom Recording Co. / Sub Pop)
 "Dirty Shirt" (October 8, 2012, Sub Pop)
 Polaris Prize 2013 (2013, Scion Sessions / Sub Pop)
 "Wait In Line" Promo (November 13, 2015, Sub Pop)
 "Can't Understand" (December 4, 2015, Adult Swim / Sub Pop)
 "Eraser" (January 22, 2016, Sub Pop)
 Metz / Swami John Reis - "Let It Rust" / "Caught Up" (April 16, 2016, Swami Records / Sub Pop)
 Metz / Mission Of Burma - "Good, Not Great" / "Get Off" (April 16, 2016, Sub Pop)

References

External links

Canadian noise rock groups
Canadian post-hardcore musical groups
Musical groups from Ottawa
Musical groups from Toronto
Musical groups established in 2007
Canadian musical trios
Sub Pop artists
2007 establishments in Ontario